Wills Township is one of twenty-one townships in LaPorte County, Indiana. As of the 2010 census, its population was 2,110 and it contained 790 housing units.

History
Wills Township was established in 1834. It was named for John Wills, a pioneer settler.

Geography

References

External links
 Indiana Township Association
 United Township Association of Indiana

Townships in LaPorte County, Indiana
Townships in Indiana